Robert W. Laing is a British production designer, art director and set decorator. He won an Academy Award and was nominated for another in the category Best Art Direction.

Selected filmography
Laing won an Academy Award for Best Art Direction and was nominated for another:
Won for Art Direction at the 55th Academy Awards for
 Gandhi (1982) - Stuart Craig, Bob Laing; Set Decoration: Michael Seirton

Nominated for Art Direction at the 45th Academy Awards for
 Travels with My Aunt (1972) - John Box, Gil Parrondo, Robert W. Laing

References

External links

British art directors
British set decorators
British film designers
Best Art Direction Academy Award winners
Year of birth missing (living people)
Living people